The presidential spokesperson was a government official whose primary responsibility was to serve as the speaking representative of the President of the Philippines. The Press Secretary (previously the Presidential Communications Operations Office Secretary) has historically assumed the role.

History
The President of the Philippines has been considered as the communicator-in-chief – with the chief executive's speeches and statements reflective of Philippine government policy. Starting from the administration of President Manuel L. Quezon, communications of the president has been supported by the presidential staff. The Executive Secretary, since from the time of the first officeholder, Jorge B. Vargas has served a dual role of presidential spokesperson and de facto press secretary.

President Elpidio Quirino was the first chief executive to institutionalize the presidential communications functions in a team, by establishing the Philippine Information Council. The Press Secretary's role during Quirino's term was defined as "serves as the presidential spokesman and his functions include issuing press releases and statements for the President and other related matters". President Ferdinand Marcos' administration was aided by the Press Secretary, Information Minister, the National Media Production Board head, and the President's Center for Strategic Studies head.

President Corazon Aquino established the presidential spokesperson as a distinct position, appointing Rene Saguisag to the role. In 1987, the post of press secretary was revived. The posts of presidential spokesperson and press secretary has been erratic; it has been dissolved, altered, and revived.

President Joseph Estrada abolished the role of presidential spokesperson through Memorandum Order No. 97, issued on April 24, 2000 and transfers the duties associated to the role to the press secretary. His successor, Gloria Macapagal Arroyo restored the position of presidential spokesperson.

On June 30, 2022, President Bongbong Marcos issued Executive Order No. 2, which abolished the said position once again. All powers and functions were transferred to the Office of the Press Secretary.

Role

The presidential spokesperson task is to speaks in behalf of the President of the Philippines on matters of "public interest, among other things". The officeholder often serves as the primary source of presidential directives in the absence of the President.

According to Harry Roque, one of people who became presidential spokesperson for President Rodrigo Duterte, the role requires to set aside one's personal stances and to relay the positions of the president. He assuming the position itself, has been subject of controversy.

Appointees to the presidential spokesperson role has never been subject to confirmation by the Congress. During the administration of President Bongbong Marcos, Press Secretary Trixie Cruz-Angeles assumed the role of Presidential Spokesperson.

List

Prior to 1998
Rene Saguisag served as President Corazon Aquino's initial spokesman until his resignation in 1987 to run for Senator. Adolfo Azcuna also served as Aquino's spokesman.

1998–2022

See also
Secretary of the Presidential Communications Operations Office
Presidential Communications Group
Office of the President of the Philippines

References

Spokesperson
Spokesperson
Spokesperson
 
2022 disestablishments in the Philippines